Washington is a giant sequoia located within Mariposa Grove in Yosemite National Park, California. The tree was named after George Washington, the 1st president of the United States. It is the 18th largest giant sequoia in the world, and could be considered the 17th largest depending on how badly Ishi Giant atrophied during the Rough Fire in 2015. It is also the largest giant sequoia north of Boole.

Description
Washington is located northeast of Columbia and General Sheridan. Washington features an almost pristine trunk with a thick crown hanging over its southern face. A small, 128 year old ponderosa pine can be found growing atop one of the limbs in Washington's crown.

The tree should not be confused with the Washington Tree of Sequoia National Park.

Dimensions

See also
List of largest giant sequoias
List of individual trees

References

Individual giant sequoia trees
Sequoia National Park